Yugsky is a rural locality (a settlement) in Kichmegnskoye Rural Settlement, Kichmengsko-Gorodetsky District, Vologda Oblast, Russia. The population was 1,076 as of 2002. There are 12 streets.

Geography 
Yugsky is located 18 km southeast of Kichmengsky Gorodok (the district's administrative centre) by road. Niva is the nearest rural locality.

References 

Rural localities in Kichmengsko-Gorodetsky District